Rashad Eyyubov (born on 3 December 1992 in Sumgayit) is an Azerbaijani football player who plays for Zira in the Azerbaijan Premier League.

Career

Club
On 22 May 2017, Eyyubov signed a one-year contract with Sumgayit FK.

On 12 June 2018, Eyyubov signed a one-year contract with Neftçi PFK, but left by mutual consent on 20 December 2018.

On 18 July 2020, he signed a one-year contract with Zira FK.

International
On 17 November 2015 Eyyubov made his senior international debut for Azerbaijan game against Moldova.

Career statistics

Club

International

Statistics accurate as of match played 11 June 2019

References

External links
 

1992 births
Living people
Azerbaijani footballers
Azerbaijan under-21 international footballers
Azerbaijan international footballers
Ukraine youth international footballers
Azerbaijan Premier League players
Simurq PIK players
Gabala FC players
Kapaz PFK players
Sumgayit FK players
Association football forwards
Association football midfielders
Neftçi PFK players
Sabah FC (Azerbaijan) players
People from Sumgait